The United Sabah People's Party (abbreviated: PBRS) is a minority political party based in Sabah, Malaysia. Presently PBRS is being led by its President Arthur Joseph Kurup. The party was previously led by its founding and first President; Joseph Kurup from 1994 to 2023. PBRS is officially a component party of Barisan Nasional (BN) coalition since 1994.

History
PBRS was formed by its founding President, Joseph Kurup who had led some disaffected members of the United Sabah Party (PBS) on 11 March 1994. On 10 June 1994, it was officially accepted as one of the component parties in the ruling Barisan Nasional (BN) coalition.

In the aftermath of the fall of BN coalition in the 2018 Malaysian general election (GE14), the party's president Joseph Kurup said they decided to quit BN but it was only confirmed after an announcement was made to the public after getting the green light from its Supreme Council on 12 May 2018. PBRS applied to join the new ruling Pakatan Harapan (PH) coalition so as to ensure its promises can be fulfilled. As such application was later ignored, in addition to the statement of Sabah PH chief Christina Liew Chin Jin that PBRS has a 'very slim chance' to be a part of PH, PBRS decided to remain with Sabah BN-UMNO to form a new coalition with other Sabah-based parties, the United Alliance of Sabah or Gabungan Bersatu Sabah (GBS) .

In the wake of the collapse of the PH federal government in the 2020 Malaysian political crisis, PBRS had attended again after a 2-year lapse the BN coalition's Supreme Council meeting along with other component parties of Peninsular Malaysia; UMNO, MCA and MIC on 12 May 2020, which had decided to declare their support for the new Prime Minister, Muhyiddin Yassin and his new Perikatan Nasional (PN) alliance federal government. PBRS deputy president who is the party's sole MP, Arthur Joseph Kurup was also appointed as the Deputy Minister in the Prime Minister's Department for Economic Affairs in the BN supported and aligned Muhyiddin's PN new ruling administration since March 2020. BN secretary-general Annuar Musa announced that as the coalition Supreme Council which was attended by the PBRS president, Joseph Kurup himself, has implicate that PBRS is still remains or has rather returns as a BN coalition component. On 9 January 2021, PBRS Deputy President, Arthur Joseph Kurup signed the Memorandum of Understanding (MoU) to set-up Gabungan Rakyat Sabah (GRS) which contested the 2020 Sabah state election earlier and managed to win to form the Sabah state governnent.On 7 January 2023, Joseph Kurup stepped down as the 1st PBRS president and became the Honorary Chairman of PBRS after helming the party from its formation in 1994 to 2023 for 29 years, party deputy president and his son Arthur Joseph Kurup took over as the 2nd party president.

Elected representatives

Dewan Rakyat (House of Representatives)

Members of Parliament of the 15th Malaysian Parliament 

PBRS currently has only one member in the House of Representatives.

Dewan Undangan Negeri (State Legislative Assembly)

Malaysian State Assembly Representatives 

Sabah State Legislative Assembly

General election results

State election results

References

External links
Facebook PBRS
Blog PBRS

Political parties in Sabah
1994 establishments in Malaysia
Political parties established in 1994